Ezequiel Jesus Tovar (born August 1, 2001) is a Venezuelan professional baseball shortstop for the Colorado Rockies of Major League Baseball (MLB). He made his MLB debut in 2022.

Career
Tovar signed with the Colorado Rockies as an international free agent in August 2017.

Tovar made his professional debut with the Dominican Summer League Rockies, batting .262 with 11 RBIs over 35 games. In 2019, he split time between the Grand Junction Rockies and the Boise Hawks with whom he slashed .253/.318/.322 with two home runs, 16 RBIs, and 17 stolen bases over 73 games. He did not play game in 2020 due to the cancellation of the minor league season. Tovar spent the 2021 season with the Fresno Grizzlies and Spokane Indians, slashing .287/.322/.475 with 15 home runs, 72 RBIs, thirty doubles, and 24 stolen bases. After the season, he played in the Arizona Fall League. He was selected to the 40-man roster following the season on November 19, 2021.

Tovar made his major league debut on September 23, 2022.

References

External links

2001 births
Living people
Albuquerque Isotopes players
Boise Hawks players
Colorado Rockies players
Dominican Summer League Rockies players
Fresno Grizzlies players
Grand Junction Rockies players
Hartford Yard Goats players
Major League Baseball infielders
Major League Baseball players from Venezuela
Salt River Rafters players
Spokane Indians players
Venezuelan expatriate baseball players in the Dominican Republic
Venezuelan expatriate baseball players in the United States